Mohamed Abdelaziz can refer to a number of people:

Mohamed Abdelaziz (Sahrawi politician) (1946–2016), President of the Sahrawi Arab Democratic Republic (1976–2016)
Mohamed Abdelaziz (Libyan politician) (born 1951/1952), Minister of Foreign Affairs of Libya (2013–2014)
Mohamed Ould Abdel Aziz (born 1956), President of Mauritania (2009–2019)
Mohamed Abdelaziz (basketball) (born 1995), Qatari basketball player

People with the given names
Mohamed Abdelaziz Tchikou (born 1985), Algerian football player